During the 2005–06 season, Red Star Belgrade participated in the 2005–06 Serbia and Montenegro SuperLiga, 2005–06 Serbia and Montenegro Cup and 2005–06 UEFA Cup.

Season summary
Red Star won their ninth double in this season.

Squad

Results

Overview

Serbia and Montenegro SuperLiga

Serbia and Montenegro Cup

UEFA Cup

Second qualifying round

First round

Group stage

See also
 List of Red Star Belgrade seasons

References

Red Star Belgrade seasons
Red Star
Serbian football championship-winning seasons